Dano-Swedish Wars are many wars between either Denmark or Denmark-Norway and Sweden.

Dano-Swedish War may also refer to:

 Dano-Swedish War (1470–71), Dane's invasion of Sweden by sea
 Dano-Swedish War (1501–1512), military conflict between Denmark and Sweden within the Kalmar Union
 Dano-Swedish War (1657–58), conflict between Sweden and Denmark–Norway during the Second Northern War
 Dano-Swedish War (1658–1660), continuation of the 1657 conflict between Sweden and Denmark–Norway
 Dano-Swedish War of 1808–09, war between Denmark–Norway and Sweden during the Napoleonic Wars
 Dano-Swedish War of 1813–14, battle between Sweden the Denmark during the War of the Sixth Coalition